Petroliam Nasional Berhad (National Petroleum Limited), commonly known as Petronas, is a Malaysian oil and gas company. Established in 1974 and wholly owned by the Government of Malaysia, the corporation is vested with all oil and gas resources in Malaysia and is entrusted with the responsibility of developing and adding value to these resources. In the 2017 Forbes Global 2000, Petronas Gas was ranked at 1881st. Petronas also ranked 48th globally in the 2020 Bentley Infrastructure 500.

Since its incorporation, Petronas has grown to be an integrated international oil and gas company with business interests in 35 countries. As of the end of March 2005, the Group comprised 103 wholly owned subsidiaries, 19 partly owned outfits and 57 associated companies. The Financial Times has identified Petronas as one of the "new seven sisters": the most influential and mainly state-owned national oil and gas companies from countries outside the OECD.

The group is engaged in a broad spectrum of petroleum activities, including upstream exploration and production of oil and gas to downstream oil refining; marketing and distribution of petroleum products; trading; gas processing and liquefaction; gas transmission pipeline network operations; marketing of liquefied natural gas; petrochemical manufacturing and marketing; shipping; automotive engineering; and property investment.

Petronas provides a substantial source of income for the Malaysian government, accounting for more than 15% of the government’s revenue from 2015 to 2020.

The company is headquartered at the Petronas Towers.

History
Before the formation of Malaysia, Royal Dutch Shell first began the oil exploration in Miri, Sarawak; after Charles Brooke signed the first Oil Mining Lease in 1909. In 1910, the first oil well was drilled in Miri. This oil well is later known as the Grand Old Lady. In 1929, oil was discovered in Brunei. There were no other drilling activities in Borneo or British Malaya until 1950s. In 1966, the enactment of Petroleum Mining Act gave Exxon and Shell rights to explore oil territories and produce oil royalties and tax payments to the government. In the late 1960s, Esso and Continental Oil were given concessions to explore oil off the shores of the east coast of Peninsular Malaysia.

Setting up a state oil and gas company: 1970s
Several factors converged in the early 1970s to prompt the Malaysian government into setting up a state oil and gas company. In 1972, the oil price per barrel was US$1.50, which later rose to US$2.28 per barrel. War in the middle east and oil embargo by Organisation of Petroleum Exporting Countries (OPEC) had caused the price per barrel to rise until US$12.00, thus giving more incentives for Malaysia to set up her own oil company. Several countries such as United Arab Emirates, Egypt, and Indonesia have adopted the production sharing agreement instead of a concession system for oil revenue distribution. The Malaysian government also believed that foreign oil companies did not properly inform the government regarding the oil exploration activities in their own concessions (such as the new discovery of oil fields), thus resulted in a loss of revenue to the government. The formulation of Malaysian New Economic Policy in the early 1970s encourages Malaysians to take control of various modern industries and to open more economic opportunities for bumiputera (Malaysian natives).

The former chief minister of Sarawak, Abdul Rahman Ya'kub was the first one who proposed the idea of Malaysia setting up an oil company in 1965, when he was the federal lands and mines minister. It was due to the pressure of the Sarawak people who sought to clarify the exact boundaries of Sarawak territorial waters. In fact, since the formation of Malaysia in 1963, the issue of territorial waters of Sabah and Sarawak has not been fully addressed, thus leaving its interpretation wide open. The Sarawak government has declared that the territorial waters extend well beyond the three-mile limit defined by the Malaysian federal government. However, Abdul Rahman Ya'kub was reminded of Tun Abdul Razak's act of installing him as the chief minister of Sarawak. Therefore, Rahman decided to keep the conflict as low profile as possible. Rahman's nephew, Abdul Taib Mahmud assumed the role of federal land and mines minister after Rahman became the chief minister of Sarawak. Taib believed in the sharing of oil royalties between the state and the federal government. During the time, the oil mining activities in Sarawak were still under the exclusive control of Shell. Taib Mahmud initially suggested allowing independent contractors to market government oil. Taib found a Lebanese trader to purchase the Malaysian oil, however, the contractor defaulted on payments, resulting in US$4 million loss. A government hydrocarbon committee was later set up. Taib Mahmud visited Indonesia and had a discussion with Pertamina (Indonesian state-owned oil and gas company). Taib suggested that Malaysia to scrap the concession system and replace it with production sharing agreement. However, there were no laws that allow Malaysia to take back the concessions without paying compensations to foreign oil companies. Despite this, Taib decided to set up a statutory body named "HIKMA" (Hidrokarbon Malaysia), which would have total rights of oil found in the territorial waters of Sabah and Sarawak. However, Rahman Ya'kub protested his nephew decision and threatened the federal government to court if Sarawak were to left out of this oil deal. Tengku Razaleigh Hamzah (chairman of Perbadanan Nasional Berhad (Pernas)) visited Rahman at the latter private residence. Tengku Razaleigh suggested the formation of a company instead of a statutory body where the former would distribute profits equally between the federal and the state governments. Rahman agreed with the suggestion. Tengku Razaleigh drafted the Petroleum Development Act together with his associates in secret, as instructed by Tun Razak, and to be completed before the 1974 Malaysian general election. Rahman Ya'kub then telephoned Tengku Razaleigh to ask about the terms offered by the Malaysian federal government. Tengku Razaleigh then told Rahman regarding abolishment of the concession system. Meanwhile, 5% oil royalty will be given to the respective oil-producing states. Rahman agreed with the deal.

In 1974, the Petroleum Development Act was tabled in parliament and approved. Petronas was incorporated on 17 August 1974, and Tengku Razaleigh became its inaugural chairman. Initially, Exxon and Shell refused to surrender their concessions and refused to negotiate with Petronas. Petronas then served a notice to all foreign oil companies that after 1 April 1975, all the foreign oil companies would be operating illegally in Malaysian waters if they do not start negotiations with Petronas. After a few rounds of negotiations, foreign oil companies finally surrendered their concessions to Petronas. While all other oil-producing states in Malaysia signed the petroleum agreement, Tun Mustapha, the chief minister of Sabah, stubbornly refused to sign the oil agreement, complaining of the meagre 5% oil royalty. Mustapha requested for 10 to 20% oil royalty, otherwise, he would threaten to pull Sabah out of Malaysia. Tengku Razaleigh refused to bulge in. The Malaysian federal government then make another deal with Datuk Harris Salleh (who was out of favour with Tun Mustapha) to establish BERJAYA party and oust Tun Mustapha out of power. However, Harris was reluctant to become the Chief Minister of Sabah, and Fuad Stephens was asked to assume to chief minister post if BERJAYA were to come to power. BERJAYA successfully ousted Tun Mustapha in 1976 Sabah state election. One week after the 1976 air crash which killed the chief minister Fuad Stephens and other five state ministers, Harris signed the oil agreement. With Sabah entering the oil agreement, Petronas finally has total control of all oil and gas reserves in Malaysia.

Petronas first embarked on the oil exploration and production activities with the formation of Petronas Carigali Sdn Bhd in 1978. In 1980, Petronas expanded its downstream businesses by setting up ASEAN Bintulu Fertiliser plant in Sarawak.

Battling oil depletion: the late 1980s

Oil exploration was by no means at an end and could yet produce more reserves. The Seligi field, which came onstream at the end of 1988 and was developed by Esso Production Malaysia, was one of the richest oilfields so far found in Malaysia waters, and further concessions to the majors would encourage exploration of the deeper waters around Malaysia, where unknown reserves could be discovered. Meanwhile, computerised seismography made it both feasible and commercially justifiable to re-explore fields which had been abandoned, or were assumed to be unproductive, over the past century. In 1990, Petronas invited foreign companies to re-explore parts of the sea off Sabah and Sarawak on the basis of new surveys using up-to-date techniques.

Another way to postpone depletion was to develop sources of oil, and of its substitute, natural gas, outside Malaysia. Late in 1989, the governments of Vietnam and Myanmar (Burma) invited Petronas Carigali to take part in joint ventures to explore for oil in their coastal waters. In 1990, a new unit, Petronas Carigali Overseas Sdn Bhd, was created to take up a 15% interest in a field in Myanmar's waters being explored by Idemitsu Myanmar Oil Exploration Co. Ltd., a subsidiary of the Japanese firm Idemitsu Oil Development Co. Ltd., in a production sharing arrangement with Myanma Oil and Gas Enterprise. Thus began Petronas's first oil exploration outside Malaysia. In May 1990, the governments of Malaysia and Thailand settled a long-running dispute over their respective rights to an area of 7,300 square kilometres in the Gulf of Thailand by setting up a joint administrative authority for the area and encouraging a joint oil exploration project by Petronas, the Petroleum Authority of Thailand, and the US company Triton Oil. In a separate deal, in October 1990, the Petroleum Authority of Thailand arranged with Petronas to study the feasibility of transferring natural gas from this jointly administered area, through Malaysia to Thailand, by way of an extension of the pipelines laid for the third stage of the Peninsular Gas Utilisation Project.

That project was on course to becoming a major element in the postponement of oil depletion. Contracts for line pipes for the second stage of the project were signed in 1989 with two consortia of Malaysian, Japanese, and Brazilian companies. This stage, completed in 1991, included the laying of 730 kilometres of pipeline through to the tip of the Peninsula, from where gas could be sold to Singapore and Thailand; the conversion of two power stations—Port Dickson and Pasir Gudang—from oil to gas; and the expansion of Petronas's output of methyl tert-butyl ether (MTBE), propylene, and polypropylene, which were already being produced in joint ventures with Idemitsu Petrochemical Co. of Japan and Neste Oy of Finland. The third and final stage of the project was to lay pipelines along the northwest and northeast coastlines of the Peninsula and was completed in 1997.

Another new venture in 1990 was in ship-owning, since Petronas's existing arrangements with MISC and with Nigeria's state oil company would be inadequate to transport the additional exports of LNG due to start in 1994, under the contract with Saibu Gas. The fact that it was built in a joint venture with Samsung of Korea, the Chinese Petroleum Corporation of Taiwan, and Caltex of the United States did not negate the policy, for the subsidiary company Petronas Penapisan (Melaka) had a decisive 45% of equity while sharing the enormous costs of and gaining advanced technology for the project. More to the point, a side effect of the refinery's completion was that Petronas was able to refine all of the crude oil it produced, instead of being partially dependent on refining facilities in Singapore.

Petronas, with its policies of promoting self-reliance, helping to develop associated industries, and varying the sources and uses of oil and gas, played an important role in the Malaysian economy as a whole. Under governments which—by current, if not historical, Western standards—were strongly interventionist, the contribution of oil taxes to the federal government's revenue hovered at around 12% to 16% until 1980, when it showed a marked increase to 23%, followed by another leap to 32% in 1981. From then until 1988 the proportion fluctuated between 29% and 36%. Petronas was not just another big oil company: it controlled a crucial sector of the economy and remained, for better or worse, an indispensable instrument of the state.

Expanding globally: the 1990s and beyond

During the mid- to late 1990s, international exploration, development, and production remained key components in Petronas's strategy along with diversification. A key discovery was made in the Ruby field in Vietnam in 1994. That year, the firm also saw its first overseas production from the Dai Hung field in Vietnam and established its first retail station outside of Malaysia in Cambodia.  In 1995, a subsidiary was created to import, store, and distribute liquefied petroleum gas (LPG). In addition, the company's polyethylene plant in Kerteh began operations. Petronas marked a significant milestone during this time period—two of its subsidiaries, Petronas Dagangan Bhd and Petronas Gas Bhd, went public on the Kuala Lumpur Stock Exchange. Between 1993 and 1996, it purchased the former sub-Saharaian branch of Mobil Oil, rebranded as Engen Petroleum.

In 1996, Petronas entered the aromatics market by way of a joint venture that created Aromatics Malaysia Sdn Bhd. It also formed a contract with China National Offshore Oil Corporation and Chevron Overseas Petroleum Ltd. to begin the exploration of block 02/31 of the Liaodong Bay area in China. While the Asian economy as a whole suffered from an economic crisis during 1997 and 1998, Malaysia was quick to bounce back due to successful government reforms. From its new headquarters in the Petronas Twin Towers, the state-owned concern continued its development in the oil and gas industry.

During 1997, Petronas heightened its diversification efforts. The firm set plans in motion to build three petrochemical plants in Kuantan as well as an acetic facility in Kerteh. Its first LPG joint venture in China was launched that year, and the company acquired a 29.3% interest in Malaysia International Shipping Corporation Berhad (MISC). In 1998, Petronas's tanker-related subsidiary merged with MISC, increasing Petronas's stake in MISC to 62%. That year, Petronas introduced the Petronas E01, the country's first commercial prototype engine. The company also signed a total of five new production sharing contracts (PSCs) in 1998 and 1999, and began oil production in the Sirri field in Iran.

Petronas entered the new century determined to expand its international efforts. The company forged deals for two new exploration plots in Pakistan and began construction on the Chad-Cameroon Integrated Oil Development and Pipeline Project. By 2002, Petronas had signed seven new PSCs and secured stakes in eight exploration blocks in eight countries, including Gabon, Cameroon, Niger, Egypt, Yemen, Indonesia, and Vietnam. The firm also made considerable progress in its petrochemicals strategy, opening new gas-based petrochemical facilities in Kerteh and Gebeng.

By 2003, Malaysia was set to usurp Algeria as the world's second-largest producer of LNG with the completion of the Malaysia LNG Tiga Plant. Prime Minister Mahathir Mohamad commented on the achievement in a May 2003 Bernama News Agency article, claiming that "the Petronas LNG complex now serves as another shining example of a vision realized of a national aspiration, transformed into reality by the same belief among Malaysians that 'we can do it.'" Indeed, Petronas had transformed itself into a global oil company over the previous decade, becoming a national symbol for success. The company realised, however, that it would have to continue its aggressive growth strategy to ensure its survival in the years to come.

The Petronas overseas expansion drive continues with the acquisition of Woodside Energy Ltd Mauritania assets for $418 million in 2007. The venture proved successful as they discovered oil in May 2008

In 2004, Minister in the Prime Minister's Department, Datuk Mustapa Mohamed, stated that Petronas contributed RM 25 Billion to the country's treasury accounting for 25% of revenue collected via dividends and other revenues. Petronas continued to focus on international exploration projects as 40% of revenue in 2008 was derived from international projects such as Iran, Sudan, Chad and Mauritania. The company's international reserves stood at 6.24 billion barrels oil equivalent in 2008. On 9 April 2019, Petronas was praised for its role in the Sudanese oil and gas industry by Minister of Oil and Gas engineer Yagoub Adam Bashir Gamaa.

On 29 October 2012, Petronas sources said it would renew a bid for gas producer Progress Energy Resources after Canada blocked its bid earlier that month. The $6-billion bid was approved by Ottawa on 7 December 2012.

On 17 January 2013, Petronas issued a statement that an onshore oil and gas discovery has been made in the state after drilling a test well about 20 kilometres away from the city of Miri in northern Sarawak. The well was found to have a net hydrocarbon thickness of 349 meters. It had flow rates of 440 barrels of crude oil per day and 11.5 million standard cubic feet of gas per day. The find is the first onshore oil discovery in Malaysia in 24 years.

On 2 May 2015, Petronas completed its acquisition of oil and gas assets in Azerbaijan from Norway's Statoil (now Equinor) for US$2.25 billion.

Plagued by the 2010s oil glut, Petronas reported on 26 February 2015 that it cut its 2015 capital expenditures budget after reporting a $2 billion fourth quarter loss, the company's first loss since it began reporting quarterly results five years ago.

On 1 April 2017, Petronas's PFLNG Satu, is the world's first floating liquefied natural gas (LNG) facility, has achieved a new milestone with the successful loading of its first cargo at the Kanowit gas field, offshore Bintulu, Sarawak.

On 25 July 2017, Petronas cancelled a $36-billion liquefied natural gas (LNG) project, the Pacific Northwest LNG, which was considered ambitious and a priority in the Canadian province of British Columbia. Both the company and the province blamed poor global LNG market conditions.

War crimes allegations in Sudan
In June 2010, the European Coalition on Oil in Sudan (ECOS) published the report "Unpaid Debt", that called upon the governments of Sweden, Austria, and Malaysia to look into allegations that Petronas, Lundin Petroleum, and OMV may have been complicit in the commission of war crimes and crimes against humanity whilst operating in Block 5A, South Sudan (then Sudan), during the period 1997–2003. The reported crimes include indiscriminate attacks and intentional targeting of civilians, burning of shelters, pillage, destruction of objects necessary for survival, unlawful killing of civilians, rape of women, abduction of children, torture, and forced displacement. When the consortium that Petronas took part in operated in Block 5A, approximately 12,000 people died, and 160,000 were violently displaced from their land and homes, many forever. Satellite pictures taken between 1994 and 2003 show that the activities of Petronas in Sudan coincided with a spectacular drop in agricultural land use in its concession area.

In June 2010, the Swedish public prosecutor for international crimes opened a criminal investigation into links between Sweden and the reported crimes. In 2016, Lundin Petroleum's Chairman Ian Lundin and CEO Alex Schneiter were informed that they were the suspects of the investigation. Sweden's Government gave the green light for the Public Prosecutor in October 2018 to indict the two top executives On 1 November 2018, and the Swedish Prosecution Authority notified Lundin Petroleum AB that the company might be liable to a corporate fine and forfeiture of economic benefits of SEK 3,285 million (app. €315 million) for involvement in war crimes and crimes against humanity. Consequently, the company itself will also be charged, albeit indirectly, and will be legally represented in court. On 15 November 2018, the suspects were served with the draft charges and the case files. They will be indicted for aiding and abetting international crimes and may face life imprisonment if found guilty. The trial is likely to begin early in 2022 and may take two years.

The Swedish war crimes investigation raises the issue of access to remedy and reparation for victims of human rights violations linked with business activities. In May 2016, representatives of communities in Block 5A claimed their right to remedy and reparation and called upon Petronas and its shareholders to pay off their debt to them. A conviction in Sweden may provide some level of remedy and reparation for the few victims of human rights violations who will testify in court, but not for the other 200,000 victims who will not be represented in court. The Swedish court cannot impose obligations upon Petronas.

On 23 May 2019, the T.M.C. Asser Institute for International Law in The Hague organized the conference 'Towards criminal liability of corporations for human rights violations: The Lundin case in Sweden'.

The international standard for business and human rights, the UNGP, underlines the duty of business enterprises to contribute to effective remedy of the adverse impact that it has caused or contributed to. The company has never publicly showed an interest in the adverse effects of its activities on the communities in its concession area. According to the Dutch peace organisation PAX, Petronas, Lundin Petroleum, OMV, as well as their shareholders are disregarding the human rights standards that they claim to respect, because they,
A.	never conducted appropriate due diligence for their Sudanese operations;
B.	made no effort to know their human rights impacts; and
C.	do not show how they address alleged adverse human rights impacts.

Petronas Carigali Overseas Sdn Bhd, a wholly owned subsidiary of Petronas Group of Companies, held a 28.5% share in the consortium that acquired the right to explore and develop oil deposits in Block 5A. In 2003, Lundin Petroleum and OMV sold their interest following a public outcry about the role of the consortium in Sudan's oil war. Petronas picked up Lundin's 40.375% working interest for a cash payment of US$142.5 million. As the operator of the consortium, Lundin Petroleum was responsible for day-to-day management. Still, it stood under the supervision of the Operating Committee, that exercised "overall direction and control of all matters pertaining to the Joint Operations and the Joint Property". Petronas was permanently represented in the Operating Committee and has never publicly distanced itself from any of its decisions.

Petronas has never publicly responded to the allegations of negative impacts in Sudan or discussed the issue with local communities. The company is not known to have taken adequate measures to prevent involvement in human rights violations during the oil war or to undo the adverse impacts of its consortium's operations.

Petronas was a loyal participant in the consortium that operated in Block 5A and had a substantial say in the way it operated. Therefore, the suspicions against the consortium's top managers also concern Petronas. The company is wholly owned by the Malaysian State. According to the UN Guiding Principles, abuse of human rights by a business enterprise that is wholly or partially controlled by a State, may entail a violation of that State's own international law obligations.

In early October 2021, the Sudanese transitional government made moves to confiscate Petronas's assets, alleging that they had been acquired through illegal means under the rule of ousted Sudanese President Omar al-Bashir. On 11 October, the Sudanese transitional government issued an arrest warrant for Petronas's country manager. In response, the Malaysian Government summoned the Sudanese charge d'affaires and urged the Sudanese government to honour the Bilateral Investment Promotion and Protection Treaty and to respect the sanctity of the Malaysian Embassy, which was housed in the same complex as the Petronas Sudan Complex in Khartoum. Petronas has also sought to cancel the manager's arrest warrant and submitted a request for arbitration at the World Bank's International Centre for Settlement of Investment Disputes (ICSID). Middle East Monitor contributor Nasim Ahmed opined that the Sudanese government's actions against Malaysian, Turkish, Qatari and Chinese companies were part of a foreign policy shift to court Western investors. Former federal counsel and University of Technology Malaysia visiting professor Salleh Buang opined that the Sudanese government's actions violated international law on the undue expropriation of commercial assets without adequate compensation, citing the 1927 Chorzów Factory case.

2022 seizure of Luxembourg assets

In February 2022, a French arbitration court known as the Tribunal de grande instance de Paris ordered the Malaysian Government to pay at least US$14.9 billion (RM 62.59 billion) to the descendants of the Sultanate of Sulu, who have laid claim to the Malaysian state of Sabah. To enforce the award, the claimants filed a saisie-arret (seize order) on 11 July 2022 for Luxembourg authorities to seize two Luxembourg-based subsidiaries of Petronas: Petronas Azerbaijan (Shah Deniz) and Petronas South Caucasus units. The descendants' territorial claim to Sabah dated back to an 1878 agreement between Baron Gustav Overbeck and Alfred Dent of the British North Borneo Company and the-then Sultan of Sulu Jamal Al Alam of Sulu. While the British and Malaysian Governments government claimed that the Sultan had permanently ceded North Borneo, the descendants of the Sultan and the Philippines Government have contended that the Sultan had merely leased the territory. Until 2013, the Malaysian Government had paid eight claimants to the Sultanate of Sulu  an annual rent of RM5,300. Following the 2013 Lahad Datu standoff, the Malaysian Government had terminated the annual stipends; prompting these descendants to pursue legal action.

On 13 July, the Malaysian Government obtained a stay on the French court's ruling, with Prime Minister Ismail Sabri Yaakob stating that the ruling undermined Malaysian sovereignty. In addition, Petronas described the seize order as "baseless" and stated it would contest the enforcement actions. It also stated that the two affected subsidiaries had already divested their assets in Azerbaijan and repatriated all their proceeds. On 18 July, Malaysian opposition politicians unsuccessfully demanded a debate on the seizure order against Petronas' assets in the Malaysian Parliament but were blocked by the Speaker of the House on procedural grounds. Law Minister Wan Junaidi Tuanku Jaafar stated that the stay would prevent the final award from being enforced in any county until a final decision by the French court regarding the Malaysian government's application that the February court ruling be canceled. By contrast, lawyers representing the Sultanate of Sulu claimants contended that the stay on the award was only valid in France and remained enforceable in other international jurisdictions, citing a United Nations treaty on international arbitration.

Corporate identity

Petronas's logo was created in 1974 by Dato Johan Ariff of Johan Design Associates. He is also responsible in creating logos for other Petronas subsidiaries, JVs, link-companies and properties, including Kuala Lumpur City Centre (KLCC), MISC, MMHE, Universiti Teknologi Petronas (UTP), Kuala Lumpur Convention Centre, Putrajaya Holdings, Prince Court Medical Centre (PCMC), PETLIN, Malaysian Petroleum Club and Mesra Mall.

In 2013, Petronas introduced a refreshed version of its corporate logo at the 2013 Asia Oil and Gas Conference (AOGC 2013).

Corporate affairs
Petronas is a corporation wholly-owned by the government of Malaysia and is directly answerable to the prime minister of Malaysia. The Malaysian federal government is the sole shareholder of the company. Key positions in the company are all appointees from the federal government. Besides, the federal government also controls the amount of dividend payout to finance the yearly budget of the country. In December 2019, prime minister Mahathir Mohamad mooted an idea of selling a percentage of Petronas stake to Sabah and Sarawak because the Pakatan Harapan government was unable to fulfill its promise of giving 20% oil royalty to both the states. The price of the purchase was reported to be RM 8 billion for one percent of the company. Such proposal met cold response from Sarawak. This is because once the shares are bought, Sarawak can only become a minority shareholder. Sarawak therefore will not have much voice in the Petronas board meetings. Due to its high share price, the money, once invested, may have difficulty to break even in the future. A lawmaker from Sarawak stated that Petronas acts as a trustee for the oil and gas fields in both the states; therefore, it makes no sense of buying a property that should have been already owned by the state governments. Besides, Petronas company brand valuation as of January 2021 was US$12 billion (RM 48 billion according to conversion rate of US$1.00 to RM 4.00). Total stockholder equity as of February 2021 was US$82 billion (RM 328 billion).

Production sharing contracts
Production-sharing contract (PSC) was signed between Petronas and other foreign oil companies in 1976. A ratio of 70:30 was agreed upon where for total amount of oil produced, other oil companies will take 20% of oil for cost recovery (cost oil), and the remaining 10% will be taken as oil royalty and shared equally between federal and respective state governments. The remaining 70% of oil (profit oil) will be divided again according to 70:30 formula where Petronas will take 70% and 30% goes to respective oil companies. Both Petronas and other oil companies will be subjected to 45% income tax by the federal government. Besides, 70% of any increase in oil price from the base price of US$12.72 will go to Petronas and the base price will increase by 5% each year so other oil companies will be able to cover for any cost inflation. In return, Petronas will not take over the equity of other oil companies. Each oil company will contribute 0.5% for a petroleum research fund.

Another PSC (the deepwater model) was developed in 1985 to attract other oil companies to enter the Malaysian oil mining scene, while taking into account the rising cost of oil exploration (cost oil of 28%). Sharing of oil revenue become more flexible, depending upon the depth of the oil is found. The deeper the oil seeps (from 200 metres to more than 1 km), the higher the cost oil (50 to 75%). However, foreign oil companies will get higher share of profit oil (from 30 to 85%) in deepwater oil mining.

In 1997, revenue over cost (R/C) model was adopted for PSC. Petronas will get higher share of profit oil as R/C ratio increases. In the mean time, 10% oil royalty stays the same throughout the years. Overall, Petronas earns 13.3% on R/C model and 12.5% on deepwater model. Meanwhile, the federal government earns 37% in R/C model and 25% in deepwater model.

Finances
Petronas has been publishing its financial reports online since 2008. However, certain quarters demanded detailed porfit and loss accounts and reports on PSCs with other companies for transparency instead of just providing a summary of profits before tax. Responding to allegations of public funds mismanagement, Petronas responded that its profits are managed by the Malaysian federal government, not by the company itself.

In 2007, Petronas revenue come from petroleum exports from Malaysia (50%), domestic operations (20%) and international operations (30%). The weightage of the revenue streams were similar in 2020, where international operations accounted for 33% of total revenue received by Petronas.

Petronas continuously provides the Malaysian government dividends from its profits. Since its inception in 1974, Petronas have paid the government RM 403.3 billion, with RM 67.6 billion in 2008. The payment represents 44% of the 2008 federal government revenue. Petronas paid RM 54 billion in dividends to the federal government in 2019. In 2022, Petronas contributed RM 50 billion to the federal government.

Subsidiaries
Petronas has more than 100 subsidiaries and around 40 Joint Venture companies in which Petronas has at least 50% stake in the company. Although Petronas is considering to listing more of its subsidiaries, so far the company has listed at least 3 of its subsidiaries in the Bursa Malaysia.

Petronas Dagangan Berhad

Involved in the distribution and sale of finished petroleum products and operations of service stations for the domestic market. The company has over 800 petrol stations around Malaysia as of July 2007, and further increased to 870 stations in January 2008.

The company has also teamed up with local food and beverage companies, banks and transportation companies to provide better services at their petrol stations. Companies include McDonald's, Kentucky Fried Chicken, Dunkin' Donuts, Konsortium Transnasional Berhad, Maybank, and CIMB Bank.

Petronas Gas Berhad
Involved in the provision of gas processing and transmission services to Petronas and its customers as a throughput company. Owns and operates the Peninsular Gas Pipeline which is 2,550 kilometres in length and runs from Kerteh in Terengganu to Johor Bahru in the South and Kangar in the North of Peninsular Malaysia.

MISC Berhad

Involved in ship-owning, ship-operating and other logistics and maritime transportation services and activities. Currently has the largest fleet of LNG transport vessels

KLCC Properties Berhad

Involved in the development and the management of the Kuala Lumpur City Centre project which includes the Petronas Twin Towers, Menara Exxon Mobil and KLCC Park. Other properties under its care include Dayabumi Complex which located near Dataran Merdeka.

Petronas Chemicals
The Petronas Chemicals is the latest company to be publicly listed. The IPO was done on 26 November 2010 with investor raise around US$4.40 billion, effectively becoming one of the largest IPO exercises in South East Asia.

The business is the largest petrochemical producer and seller in South East Asia. Products include olefins, polymers, fertilisers, methanol and other basic chemicals and derivative products.

Malaysian Marine and Heavy Engineering

MMHE was listing on 29 October 2010 with MYR 1 billion raised on its IPO exercise.

The business builds offshore structures for oil and gas applications, help repair large vessels and converts vessels into Floating production storage and offloading and FSOs.

Other principal subsidiaries
Some of the key subsidiaries are:-
 Petronas Carigali Sdn Bhd – Main Hydrocarbon exploration arm
 E&P O&M Services Sdn Bhd (EPOMS) – Main Oil & Gas Maintenance Services – Cendor Phase 2 FPSO project, Bertam, Sepat, Layang, Gumusut-Kakap.
 Petronas Carigali Overseas Sdn Bhd – Hydrocarbon exploration arm aimed at finding new blocks in international areas
 Petronas Research Sdn Bhd – Conducting research and development
 MITCO Sdn Bhd – International Trading of non-oil assets
 Petronas Fertiliser Kedah – Creating urea fertiliser
 Petronas Methanol (Labuan) Sdn. Bhd. (PMLSB) – Methanol plant

Others include Petronas Assets Sdn Bhd; Petronas Maritime Services Sdn Bhd; Petronas Selenia (OEM Oil for FCA, AREXONS); Petronas Trading Corp. Sdn Bhd; Petronas Argentina S.A.; Petronas Australia Pty Ltd.; Petronas Thailand Co. Ltd.; Petronas Energy Philippines Inc.; Petronas Cambodia Co. Ltd.; Petronas Technical Services Sdn Bhd; Petronas Group Technical Solutions Sdn Bhd; Petronas South Africa Pty Ltd.; Petronas India Holdings Company Pte Ltd.; Petronas China Co. Ltd.; Petronas International Corp. Ltd.; Petronas Marketing Thailand Co. Ltd.; Myanmar Petronas Trading Co. Ltd.; Petronas Canada; Petronas Marketing (Netherlands) B.V. and Indianoil Petronas

Commercial automotive and motorcycle partnerships
Petronas is an official recommended flagship fuel and lubricants for Mercedes-Benz (including Mercedes-AMG models), Proton, Perodua, and Tata Motors for automobiles. They are also recommended fuel and lubricants for Modenas and Yamaha motorcycles.

Motorsport

Car racing

Petronas was one of the main sponsors of the BMW Sauber Formula One team alongside Intel, and supplied lubricants and fuel to the team. It also owned 40% of Sauber Petronas Engineering, the company that builds chassis which formerly used Ferrari designed engines used by the Sauber team, until being bought out by German motor company BMW. Petronas was also the main sponsor for the Malaysian Grand Prix, and co-sponsored the Chinese Grand Prix, and the inaugural Korean Grand Prix. Petronas was the exclusive premium partner of the Sauber Petronas (1995–2005) and BMW Sauber (2006–2009) F1 teams. BMW had acquired the controlling stake of the former Sauber Petronas Engineering, but left the sport after the 2009 season. On 21 December 2009, Petronas was confirmed as moving from BMW Sauber to the newly formed Mercedes AMG Petronas Formula One team.
In terms of further Formula One involvement, every year Petronas took the BMW Sauber team to various parts of Malaysia for F1 demos, so the public who are unable to go to the track itself get to experience a little bit of what F1 offers. Other promotional events are held in the run up to the race and the drivers play an integral part in this so much so that Nick Heidfeld conceded that there were more fans for BMW Sauber in Malaysia than in most other countries.

Petronas also sponsors many other sporting events and teams, mostly motorsports. Some of these sponsorships include the PERT (Petronas EON Rally Team), and also the Petronas Adventure Team, a 4X4 adventure team. More recently Petronas was also a major sponsor for Petronas TOYOTA TEAM TOM'S which was participating in Super GT series, which they won the team title in 2008 and driver title in 2009. The series also raced in Malaysia every season at Sepang International Circuit between 2005 and 2013. Petronas signed a three-year sponsorship agreement with Yamaha MotoGP team. The Petronas branding can be seen starting Qatar race on the 10 to 12 April 2009. Petronas also sponsors all Mercedes-AMG DTM cars from the 2011 season until Mercedes' DTM exit in 2018 (replacing Mobil 1) for only providing the lubricants.

Since 2010, Petronas has been the main sponsor of the Mercedes AMG Petronas F1 team. Mercedes have won eight straight Constructors' Championship titles and 7 Drivers' Championship titles from the beginning of the 1.6 litre (97.6 cu in) turbocharged V6 engine era in  until . In addition Petronas also supplies fuels and lubricants for Honda-powered Red Bull-owned Italian team Scuderia Toro Rosso, known as Scuderia AlphaTauri since the 2020 season. Petronas' title and technical partnership with Mercedes is extended from the 2026 season onwards.

Motorcycle racing
In 1996, Petronas sponsored a Grand Prix motorcycle racing team called Petronas Sprinta TVK in the 250cc class with Yamaha as the manufacturer. The team got a wildcard opportunity at the Malaysian motorcycle Grand Prix with Shahrol Yuzy as its the rider. In the following season in 1997, the team received another wildcard and raced in the 125cc class. This time Honda was chosen as the manufacturer. Then two seasons later, Petronas Sprinta TVK returned to the 250cc class. From 2000 to 2002, the team competed for a full season in the 250cc class on Yamaha bikes. 

Petronas also sponsors the Malaysian Cub Prix races, and the now-defunct Foggy Petronas Superbike team (in which Petronas debuts their superbike, the FP1).  Then, Petronas became a team sponsor in the Moto2 championship in the 2011 season called the Petronas Malaysia Team with Hafizh Syahrin as the rider and using the Moriwaki motorcycle. Then in the 2012 season, Petronas became the sponsor of the Malaysian Raceline Team when he received a wildcard at the Malaysian Sepang Grand Prix with Hafizh Syahrin, who at that time switched to using an FTR motorcycle. It was in this season that Syahrin managed to get on the podium for the first time. The team then got another wildcard in the following season, until in the 2014-2017 season, the team participated in full competition in the season with Kalex as the manufacturer. 

Since 2017, Petronas has been the main sponsor of the Sepang Racing Team, which at that time competed in the Moto2 and Moto3 classes and was named Petronas Sprinta Racing. In the Moto3 class the team uses Honda bikes, while in Moto2 it uses Kalex. At 2019, Petronas is the main sponsor of the new Petronas Yamaha SRT, which became the satellite team for Yamaha in MotoGP following Tech3's switch to KTM bikes after 20 years with Yamaha bikes. Their riders are Valentino Rossi and 2017 Moto2 World Champion Franco Morbidelli. In addition, Petronas also played a role for supplying fuels, motorcycle oil and other products for Petronas Yamaha SRT MotoGP team. But unfortunately, at the end of the 2021 season, Petronas did not continue its cooperation to become the main sponsor of the SRT team.

In 2022, Petronas returned as a team sponsor in Moto2 with their wildcard riders Kasma Daniel in the Petronas MIE Racing team and Azroy Anuar with the Petronas RW Racing team. Both riders compete in the Malaysian series. 

From 2023, Petronas became the title sponsor of a World Superbike and World Supersport racing team, MIE Honda Racing and changed its name to Petronas MIE Honda Racing Team. Their riders are Hafizh Syahrin & Eric Granado for WSBK category, and Adam Norrodin & Tarran Mackenzie for WSSP category at this season.

As part of its corporate social responsibility programme, Petronas also brings underprivileged children to watch the races.

Education

Petronas awards education sponsorships in the form of convertible loans to Malaysian and international students to further their studies at local or foreign universities. The Petronas unit that is responsible for handling education matters is called the Sponsorship & Talent Sourcing Unit (STS). These sponsorships are awarded based on academic results, co-curricular activities, family background as well as an assessment of student personality (which is conducted throughout a program called EduCamp, which all prospective Petronas students are required to undergo). Students who are absorbed by Petronas at the end of their tertiary studies have their convertible loans converted into full scholarships. These students are under contractual agreement to work for the company for two years, for every one year they are sponsored. Petronas has its own research university, Universiti Teknologi Petronas (UTP). Built in 1997, the campus is located in Seri Iskandar, Perak.

See also
 Petronas Gallery
 Petrosains

References

External links

  

 
1974 establishments in Malaysia
Oil and gas companies of Malaysia
Government-owned companies of Malaysia
Prime Minister's Department (Malaysia)
Malay
Automotive fuel retailers
Malaysian brands
Energy companies established in 1974
Non-renewable resource companies established in 1974
Retail companies established in 1974
Companies based in Kuala Lumpur
Conglomerate companies of Malaysia
Multinational companies headquartered in Malaysia
Companies listed on Bursa Malaysia